Islington was a civil parish and metropolitan borough in London, England. It was an ancient parish within the county of Middlesex, and formed part of The Metropolis from 1855. The parish was transferred to the County of London in 1889 and became a metropolitan borough in 1900. It was amalgamated with the Metropolitan Borough of Finsbury to form the London Borough of Islington in Greater London in 1965.

Geography
The borough comprised the districts of Pentonville (also partly in Clerkenwell/Finsbury), Islington (also partly in Clerkenwell/Finsbury), Barnsbury, Lower Holloway, Holloway, Tufnell Park (also partly in St Pancras), Archway, Highbury, and Canonbury.

The neighbouring boroughs were Finsbury, Hackney, Stoke Newington, Shoreditch, St Pancras.

Governance
The parish of St Mary Islington operated as an open vestry. It was added to the bills of mortality area in 1636. The vestry was incorporated by the Metropolis Management Act 1855 as an administrative vestry in the metropolitan area managed by Metropolitan Board of Works. On 21 March 1889 the MBW was abolished and the parish was transferred from the County of Middlesex to the newly formed County of London. Because of the reforms directed by the London Government Act 1899, on 1 November 1900 the old parish was abolished and replaced by the Metropolitan Borough of Islington. The act allowed for the London County Council (1889-1965) and the metropolitan boroughs to transfer powers to and from each other, if both the county council and a majority of the boroughs agreed. Unlike municipal boroughs which received a grant of a charter of incorporation, the London metropolitan boroughs had no charters, being created by act of parliament.

The first election of councillors was set for 1 November 1900, with a third of the councillors going out of office each year. The borough was divided into wards, with three councillors for each ward. There were aldermen at a ratio of one to every six councillors. The chairman of the council received the title of mayor.

Services
The vestry started work on an electricity supply service at Eden Grove in 1894, which became operational in 1896. New streets were lit with electric light from 1906. In 1936 electricity showrooms were opened at the corner of Holloway Road and Camden Road. The electric supply service became part of the London Electricity Board following the Electricity Act 1947.

Poor law
It was a local act parish so did not come under the Poor Law Amendment Act 1834 and the vestry continued to be responsible for poor relief, instead of a separately elected board of guardians. This anomaly was rectified by the Metropolitan Poor Act 1867. The parish was large enough in terms of population to avoid being grouped into a poor law union and remained a single parish for this purpose.

Town Hall

Islington Town Hall on Upper Street was the headquarters of Metropolitan Borough of Islington and remains the headquarters of its successor body, Islington London Borough Council.

Population and area
The metropolitan borough was conterminous with the Vestry authority, when it was formed in 1900. Statistics compiled by the London County Council, in 1901 show the population growth in London, over the preceding century.

The populations recorded in National Censuses were:

Islington Vestry 1801–1899

Metropolitan Borough 1900–1961

By comparison, after amalgamation with Finsbury, to form the modern London Borough of Islington, the combined area became ; in 2005, this had a population of 182,600, or a population density of 12,288/km2. In 1901 Islington the population density was 26,778/km2.

Archival records

Islington Local History Centre holds records of the Metropolitan Borough of Islington, including council and committee minutes, rate books and publications.

Politics

Under the Metropolis Management Act 1855 any parish that exceeded 2,000 ratepayers was to be divided into wards; as such the incorporated vestry of St Mary Islington was divided into six wards (electing vestrymen): No. 1 or Upper Holloway (9), No. 2 or Lower Holloway (12), No. 3 or Highbury (15), No. 4 or Thornhill (18), No. 5 or Barnsbury (18), No. 6 or St Mary's (15), No. 7 or Canonbury (15) and No. 8 or St Peter's (18).

In 1896 as its population had increased the incorporated vestry was re-divided into eleven wards (electing vestrymen): No. 1 or Tufnell (12), No. 2 or Upper Holloway (12), No. 3 or Tollington (9), No. 4 or Lower Holloway (15), No. 5 or West Highbury (15), No. 6 or East Highbury (12), No. 7 or Thornhill (9), No. 8 or Barnsbury (6), No. 9 or St Mary's (9), No. 10 or Canonbury (9) and No. 11 or St Peter's (12).

The metropolitan borough was divided into eleven wards for elections: Barnsbury, Canonbury, Highbury, Lower Holloway, Mildmay, St Mary, St Peter, Thornhill, Tollington, Tufnell and Upper Holloway.

Borough council

Parliament constituency
For elections to Parliament, the borough was divided into four constituencies:
Islington East
Islington North
Islington South
Islington West
In 1950 the borough's representation was reduced to three seats:
Islington East
Islington North
Islington South West

See also
Finsbury Town Hall
Metropolis Management Act 1855
London Government Act 1899
London Government Act 1963
London Borough of Islington

References

Further reading
 

Metropolitan boroughs of the County of London
History of the London Borough of Islington
Politics of the London Borough of Islington
1900 establishments in the United Kingdom
1965 disestablishments in the United Kingdom
Districts abolished by the London Government Act 1963